The 1938 SMU Mustangs football team was an American football team that represented Southern Methodist University (SMU) as a member of the Southwest Conference (SWC) during the 1938 college football season. In their fourth season under head coach Matty Bell, the Mustangs compiled a 6–4 record (4–2 against conference opponents) and outscored opponents by a total of 148 to 125. The team played its home games at Ownby Stadium in University Park, Texas, and the Cotton Bowl in Dallas.

Schedule

References

SMU
SMU Mustangs football seasons
SMU Mustangs football